CFAV Glenbrook (YTB 643) is a Glen class naval tugboat operated by the Royal Canadian Navy. Built at Georgetown Shipyard, Georgetown, Prince Edward Island, and launched in 1976, the ship was delivered on 16 December 1976. Attached to Maritime Forces Atlantic, the ship is based at CFB Halifax.

References

Fleet of the Royal Canadian Navy
1976 ships
Glen-class tugs (1975)
Auxiliary ships of the Royal Canadian Navy